Major-General Sir Thomas Owen Marden  (15 September 1866 – 11 September 1951) was a British Army officer, active during the Second Boer War and World War I, where he commanded a battalion of the Welsh Regiment, a brigade, and finally the 6th Division. Following the war, he commanded a British occupying force in Turkey during the Chanak Crisis in the early 1920s.

Early career
Born in Bath, Somerset, England, Marden attended Berkhamsted School and the Royal Military College, Sandhurst, before joining the Cheshire Regiment as a lieutenant on 25 August 1886. He saw service with his regiment in Burma from 1887 to 1889, during the colonial campaigns following the Third Anglo-Burmese War, and was promoted to captain on 15 May 1896. Following the outbreak of the Second Boer War, he was posted on special duty as District Commandant in South Africa. Leaving London in February 1900, he was senior officer in command of reinforcements on board the SS Cheshire for the journey, and arrived in South Africa the following month. He was mentioned in despatches for service during the war. He returned to England to attend the Staff College, Camberley, graduating in 1902 and posted to staff duties in India as a deputy assistant adjutant-general. In 1904 he was posted to the Directorate of Training at the War Office, moving to a staff posting in South Africa in 1910.

Whilst on staff duties, in 1905, he had been promoted to a majority in the Northumberland Fusiliers, and in 1908 transferred into the Welsh Regiment. In 1912 he was promoted to lieutenant-colonel, and left South Africa in order to take up command of the 1st Battalion, Welsh Regiment.

World War I
At the outbreak of World War I, Marden's battalion was stationed in India; it was brought back to the United Kingdom and allocated to the 84th Brigade of the 28th Division, which was to be sent to the Mediterranean. Whilst passing through France, units of the division were used to support operations on the Western Front, and Marden was wounded by shrapnel whilst commanding his battalion at the Second Battle of Ypres.

Later in 1915, he was promoted to command the 114th Infantry Brigade, part of the 38th (Welsh) Division, a Kitchener's Army formation. He commanded the brigade until mid-1917, during which time it fought at the Battle of the Somme, where it took heavy losses, and on the first day of the Battle of Passchendaele. In August 1917 he was again promoted, this time to become General Officer Commanding (GOC) of the 6th Division, which he commanded at the Battle of Cambrai and in the Hundred Days Offensive in the latter half of 1918. Following the Armistice with Germany, he commanded a brigade in the occupying British Army of the Rhine (BAOR).

For his services during the war, he was mentioned in despatches eight times, and made a Companion of the Order of the Bath and a Companion of the Order of St Michael and St George, as well as being made an officer of the French Légion d'Honneur and the Russian Order of St. Vladimir (fourth class, swords), and awarded the Croix de Guerre with palm.

Later service
In 1920, Marden was given command of the British division occupying Constantinople. During the Chanak Crisis of 1922 he played a key role in negotiating a peaceful settlement between British and Turkish forces, for which he later received a knighthood. He returned home in 1923 to become GOC of the 53rd (Welsh) Infantry Division, a Territorial Army (TA) formation, before retiring in June 1927. He held the ceremonial colonelcy of the Welch Regiment from 1920 to 1941.

In 1920, he wrote a short history of 6th Division from 1914 to 1918, and in 1932 wrote a history of the Welch Regiment during the same period.

He died at Folkestone, Kent, in 1951 aged eighty-four and was buried St Martin's churchyard at nearby Cheriton.

References

External links
 
 

 

|-

 

|-

 

1866 births
1951 deaths
Burials in Kent
British Army major generals
Military personnel from Somerset
British Army personnel of the Second Boer War
British Army generals of World War I
Cheshire Regiment officers
Royal Northumberland Fusiliers officers
Welch Regiment officers
People educated at Berkhamsted School
Graduates of the Royal Military College, Sandhurst
Graduates of the Staff College, Camberley
People from Bath, Somerset
Knights Commander of the Order of the British Empire
Companions of the Order of St Michael and St George
Companions of the Order of the Bath